First Presbyterian Church of Natchez is a historic church at 117 S. Pearl Street in Natchez, Mississippi. It was built in 1830 with Greek Revival and Federal style architectural features.  The building was added to the National Register of Historic Places in 1978. It also became a contributing property to the Natchez On-Top-of-the-Hill Historic District in 1979. For many years The Manse (Natchez, Mississippi) housed its pastors.

References

External links

Presbyterian churches in Mississippi
Churches on the National Register of Historic Places in Mississippi
Federal architecture in Mississippi
Greek Revival church buildings in Mississippi
Churches completed in 1830
19th-century Presbyterian church buildings in the United States
Churches in Natchez, Mississippi
1830 establishments in Mississippi
National Register of Historic Places in Natchez, Mississippi
Individually listed contributing properties to historic districts on the National Register in Mississippi